Danny Shea may refer to:

 Danny Shea (footballer) (1887–1960), footballer who played as an inside-forward
 Danny Shea (The Godfather), a fictional character in Mark Winegardner's novels The Godfather Returns and The Godfather's Revenge